Qeshlaq-e Gazlu Hajji Mohammad (also Romanized as Qeshlāq-e Gāzlū Ḩājjī Moḩammad) is a village in Qeshlaq Rural District, Abish Ahmad District, Kaleybar County, East Azerbaijan Province, Iran. At the 2006 census, its population was 40, in 8 families.

References 

Populated places in Kaleybar County